Petr Zieris (born 19 March 1989) is a Czech footballer currently playing for SK Slovan Varnsdorf on loan from Slovan Liberec. He plays as a central defender.

References

External links
 Guardian Football

1989 births
Living people
Czech footballers
Czech First League players
FC Slovan Liberec players
FK Varnsdorf players
FK Náchod-Deštné players
Association football defenders
Sportspeople from Opava